Nathalie Malépart (born c. 1973) is a Canadian politician.  She was a City Councillor in Montreal, Quebec.

Background

She was born in Montreal about 1973 and was the daughter of politician Jean-Claude Malépart, who was Liberal Member of the House of Commons from 1979 to 1989.

City Councillor

She was elected to the City Council as a Vision Montreal candidate in 1994 in the district of Maisonneuve.  She crossed the floor to sit as an Independent in 1997 and did not run for re-election in 1998.

Provincial Politics

Malépart ran as the Liberal candidate in a 2006 by-election in the riding of Sainte-Marie–Saint-Jacques, but was defeated by former colleague Martin Lemay.

Electoral record (partial)

Footnotes

See also

 Vision Montreal Crisis, 1997

1973 births
Living people
Montreal city councillors
Women municipal councillors in Canada
Women in Quebec politics